Leopold Giebisch (7 November 1901 – 20 April 1945) was an Austrian footballer. He played in four matches for the Austria national football team from 1927 to 1929.

Personal life
Giebisch served as an Unteroffizier (corporal) in the German Army during the Second World War. He was killed in action in East Prussia on 20 April 1945.

References

External links
 

1901 births
1945 deaths
Austrian footballers
Austria international footballers
Place of birth missing
Association footballers not categorized by position
German Army personnel killed in World War II
German Army soldiers of World War II
Burials in Russia